Michael Lewis MacLennan (born June 5, 1968) is a Canadian playwright, television writer and television producer, best known as a writer and producer of television series such as Queer as Folk and Bomb Girls.

As a playwright he is a two-time nominee for the Governor General's Award for English-language drama, and the only playwright to win the Herman Voaden Playwriting Competition twice.

Career
Born in Vancouver, British Columbia, MacLennan began his career as a stage actor. In his first theatre role at age 13, he was cast to play a woman, and later in his career he produced a short performance piece about his fear at the time that his parents would see the play and realize that he was gay. He moved to Victoria in 1986 to study English at the University of Victoria.

His first full-length play, Beat the Sunset, premiered at the Victoria Fringe Festival in 1993. It was later staged in Vancouver in 1995, winning MacLennan a Jessie Award for outstanding emerging playwright and the Theatrum National Playwriting Competition.

His second play, Leaning Over Railings, premiered in 1995. His 1996 Grace won the Theatre BC National Playwriting Competition, and has been produced across Canada and internationally. During this era, he also wrote a number of short one-act plays, including Wake No Clocks and Come On!.

He then began to study screenwriting at the Canadian Film Centre, although he continued to write plays during this time. He won the Herman Voaden Playwrighting Competition in 1998 for his play The Shooting Stage, and in 2001 for Last Romantics. Both plays were later nominated for the Governor General's Award for English drama, The Shooting Stage at the 2002 Governor General's Awards and Last Romantics at the 2003 Governor General's Awards.

He began his television career as writer and story editor for Sullivan Entertainment's television series Wind at My Back, Anne of Green Gables: The Animated Series and Super Rupert. He then became a writer and co-executive producer on Queer as Folk, writing 14 episodes over four seasons. Concurrently with the final season of Queer as Folk, he co-created and produced the Citytv dramedy series Godiva's in 2005.

In 2006, he created a theatrical adaptation of Douglas Coupland's novel Life After God, resulting in Coupland inviting him to write and coproduce the television series adaptation of Coupland's novel jPod.

He was cocreator and executive producer of Bomb Girls, which premiered in 2011.

His other credits as a writer and producer have included The Guard, Being Erica, Flashpoint, Bitten and  The Fosters.

Plays
Beat the Sunset
Grace
The Shooting Stage
Last Romantics
Life After God

References

External links

1968 births
Living people
20th-century Canadian dramatists and playwrights
21st-century Canadian dramatists and playwrights
20th-century Canadian screenwriters
21st-century Canadian screenwriters
Canadian male screenwriters
Canadian gay writers
Canadian LGBT screenwriters
Writers from Vancouver
Canadian television writers
Canadian LGBT dramatists and playwrights
Canadian male dramatists and playwrights
LGBT producers
Canadian television producers
University of Victoria alumni
Canadian Film Centre alumni
20th-century Canadian male writers
21st-century Canadian male writers
Canadian male television writers
Gay screenwriters
Gay dramatists and playwrights
21st-century Canadian LGBT people
20th-century Canadian LGBT people